Pultenaea kraehenbuehlii is a species of flowering plant in the family Fabaceae and is endemic to a restricted area of South Australia. It is a dense, erect, many-branched shrub with hairy branches, narrow egg-shaped to lance-shaped leaves with the narrower end towards the base, and yellow-orange and red flowers.

Description

Taxonomy and naming
Pultenaea kraehenbuehlii was first formally described in 1998 by Peter J. Lang in the Journal of the Adelaide Botanic Gardens from specimens he collected in the Northern Mount Lofty Ranges. The specific epithet (kraehenbuehlii) honours the South Australian botanist Darrell N. Kraehenbuehl.

Distribution
This pultenaea is restricted to the Tothill Range and nearby Spring Hill in the Mount lofty Ranges of South Australia.

References

kraehenbuehlii
Flora of South Australia
Plants described in 1998